Teurlings Catholic High School is a private, Roman Catholic high school in the Roman Catholic Diocese of Lafayette, Lafayette, Louisiana, US .

Background
Teurlings Catholic High School was established in 1955 as Father Teurlings High School.  Father William J. Teurlings was the pastor who envisioned the school and arranged for the purchase of the property the school sits on.  The school opened shortly before his death in 1957.

Feeder schools
Most students feed from the following schools (located in Lafayette unless otherwise noted):
 Sts. Leo Seton Catholic School
 St. Genevieve Middle School
 St. Bernard School (Breaux Bridge)
 Carencro Catholic School (Carencro)
 Immaculate Heart of Mary
 Holy Family Catholic School
St. Peter & Paul Catholic School

Though they are not recognized as feeder schools, some students come from schools such as Our Lady of Fatima, St. Pius X, St. Cecilia School (Broussard), Cathedral Carmel School, and various public schools around Lafayette Parish.

Athletics
Teurlings Catholic athletics competes in the LHSAA.

Notable alumni 
David Begnaud, CBS News
Kacie Cryer, basketball coach
Jake Delhomme, football player
Taylor Dugas, baseball player

Notes and references

External links
 School Website

Catholic secondary schools in Louisiana
Schools in Lafayette, Louisiana
Educational institutions established in 1955
1955 establishments in Louisiana